John Dee (1527–c. 1608) was a Welsh mathematician, astronomer, astrologer, occultist, navigator, imperialist, and consultant to Queen Elizabeth I.

John Dee may also refer to:
 John Dee (basketball) (1923–1999), Basketball coach
 John Dee, the alter-ego of Doctor Destiny, the DC Comics supervillain and Sandman character
 Johnny Dee, a Marvel Comics character, one of the mutants
 Johnny Dee (musician) (born 1964), American heavy metal drummer
 Johnnie Dee, frontman for the 1980s Canadian hard rock/AOR band, Honeymoon Suite
 John D. Loudermilk (1934–2016), known as John Dee, 1950s and 1960s American singer and songwriter
 John MacKenzie Dee, English rugby player for Hartlepool Rovers

See also 
 Jon Dee Graham (born 1959), musician and songwriter from Texas, U.S.A.
 Jack Dee (born 1961), English comedian